Sheila Mwine Kabaije (born 26 February 1968), is a Ugandan teacher and legislator, who serves as the elected woman representative for Kiruhura District in the 10th Parliament of Uganda (2016 to 2021). She is a member of the ruling National Resistance Movement political party.

Background and education
Sheila Mwine attended Buganda Road Primary School, in the city of Kampala, Uganda's capital. In 1982 she was admitted to Gayaza High School, a prestigious all-girls middle and high school in Wakiso District. She studied there for both her O-Level and A-Level education, graduating in 1988 with a High School Diploma.

She attended the then Institute of Teacher Education, Kyambogo, which as of 2021 is a component of Kyambogo University, graduating with a Diploma in Secondary Education in 1990. She continued her education at Makerere University, Uganda's oldest and largest public university, graduating with a Bachelor of Education degree, in 1996. Her degree of Master of Education Organisation, Planning and Management, was awarded by the University of Reading, in 2005.

Career as teacher
Sheila Mwine started out as a teacher at Kinoni Girls School, in Mbarara City between 1991 and 1994. She was later transferred to Bishop Kivengere Girls School, Muyebe as a deputy headteacher between 1997 and 2001 after which she served as head teacher of the same school between 2001 and 2007. Subsequently, she served as the District Education Officer for Kiruhura District Local Government, from 2007 to 2015.

Career as politician
She successfully contested for the Women's Constituency seat of Kiruhura District, during the 2016 election season. In Uganda's 10th parliament, she is a member of the committee on Education and Sports as well as that of Commissions, State Authorities and State Enterprises.

References

External links
 Gazetted List of Elected Members of Parliament of Uganda In 2016
 Special Report: Over 100 MPs Who Have Not Spoken In 2017 Named As of 3 January 2019.

Living people
1968 births
Kyambogo University alumni
Makerere University alumni
Alumni of the University of Reading
Members of the Parliament of Uganda
Women members of the Parliament of Uganda
National Resistance Movement politicians
People educated at Gayaza High School
21st-century Ugandan women politicians
21st-century Ugandan politicians
People from Kiruhura District
People from Western Region, Uganda